The men's artistic gymnastics team all-around competition at the 2015 European Games was held at the National Gymnastics Arena, Baku on 14 and 15 June 2015. The team final also served as a qualification round for the all-around and event finals.

Qualification

Results

Qualification for finals
This competition also served as the qualification round for the all-around final and the event finals. The top 18 gymnasts with only one per country qualified for the all-around final. The top 6 gymnasts on each event with only one per country qualified for the event finals.

All-around

Floor

Pommel horse

Rings

Vault

Parallel bars

Horizontal bar

References

All-around artistic gymnastics
Men's artistic team all-around